Slingshot, in comics, may refer to:

 Slingshot, an alias used by the Image Comics character Menagerie (Image Comics)
 Slingshot, the alias of Marvel Comics character Yo-Yo Rodriguez
 Slingshot, the alter ego of Silk Spectre (Laurie Juspeczyk), a Watchmen character
 Slingshot (Transformers), a Transformer who has appeared in comic book adaptations of the toys
 Slingshot (DC Comics), two DC Comics characters

See also
Slingshot (disambiguation)

References